Lilly may refer to:

Arts and entertainment 
 Lilly (film), a 1958 Malayalam film
 Lilly (album), by Antonello Venditti, 1975
 "Lilly", a song by Pink Martini from the 2004 album Hang On Little Tomato
Lilly the Witch, or Lilly in the UK, an animated TV show
 The Lilly (poem), a 1794 poem by William Blake

People and fictional characters 
 Lilly (given name), a list of people and fictional characters
 Lilly (surname), a list of people
 Lilly K, pseudonym of American dancer and YouTuber Lilliana Ketchman (born 2008)

Places

France
 Lilly, Eure, a commune

United States
 Lilly, Georgia, a city
 Lilly Historic District
 Lilly, Missouri, an unincorporated community
 Lilly, Pennsylvania, a borough
 Lilly, Virginia, an unincorporated community
 Lilly, West Virginia, a ghost town

Other uses
 Eli Lilly and Company, an American pharmaceutical  corporation 
 Lilly Prize (disambiguation)
 Swallow (1779 EIC packet), a packet ship purchased by the Royal Navy and renamed Lilly

See also 

 Lili (disambiguation)
 Lille (disambiguation)
 Lilley (disambiguation)
 Lilli (disambiguation)
 Lillie (disambiguation)
 Lily (disambiguation)